SKE48 (S.K.E. Forty-eight) is a Japanese idol group produced by Yasushi Akimoto. SKE48 is named after the Sakae district in Nagoya of Aichi Prefecture, where the group is based. The group performs at SKE48 Theater on 2F of Sunshine Sakae, a shopping center in Sakae, Nagoya. Avex Group is its current official label. The group has sold nearly 11 million CDs in Japan.

Concept 

SKE48 was founded based on the concept of "idols you can meet". The group's chief producer Yasushi Akimoto once said that his aim was to create an idol group that is unlike any other ordinary idol groups (who only give occasional concerts and are mostly seen on TV). SKE48 would perform in its own theater regularly, and fans would always be able to watch the girls performing live. The SKE48 Theater is in the Sunshine Sakae of Nagoya, Aichi. Members of this group are dispatched into three groups, chronologically named "Team S", "Team KII" and "Team E". Kenkyūsei (trainees) is the group of members training to be promoted into one of these teams.

History 

Yasushi Akimoto was offered the chance to start a production in Nagoya along with the renewal of the Sunshine Sakae 2F, when he was thinking of expanding his "48 project" nationwide. He had offers from outside Japan, but he decided to use Nagoya as the place to move on with the project. Akimoto said that selected members from AKB48 and SKE48 may release a single together. They released their first single in 2009.

In AKB48's single "Ōgoe Diamond", Jurina Matsui became the center and the first and only member of SKE48 to be featured on a single cover and in the song itself. Including Matsui, some members of SKE48 have appeared in the PV, marking the first collaboration made by the two groups so far.

On May 28, 2011, Avex picked up SKE48 and were to release their debut single under the label called “Pareo wa Emerald” on July 27, 2011.

On August 25, it was announced that SKE48 member Yui Matsushita would leave the group at the end of September 2011 due to ankle injuries.

On August 7, 2012, SKE48 member and captain of Team S, Hirata Rikako announced her graduation to pursue a career as a reporter.

On the first day of the Tokyo Dome Concert held on August 24, 2012, it was announced that Rie Kitahara of AKB48, Team K would hold a concurrent position in SKE48. Anna Ishida of Team KII would hold a concurrent position in AKB48, Team B.

On November 1, it was announced that Kumi Yagami, one of the group's first generation members, would graduate but the date was not announced.

On December 9, SKE48CAFE&SHOP with AKB48 was opened to the building 5F with a theater. There is a cooking menu that the members of SKE48 devised.

On January 15, 2013, it was announced that eight members, three from Team S, two each from Team KII and E, and one kenkyusei, would graduate from the group, along with Yagami (whose graduation was already announced in November 2012) sometime in the spring 2013. On April 13, it was announced that teams were to be reorganized and nine kenkyusei members would be promoted to full members. Yuka Nakanishi became the captain of SKE48 as well as leader of Team S, and Rena Matsui was promoted to leader of Team E. Rie Kitahara, who was in both SKE48 and AKB48, was removed from SKE48's lineup during the final concert of "AKB48 Group Rinji Soukai" concert series at the Nippon Budokan on 28 April, with her final theater performance as a SKE48 member on May 9.

On February 24, 2014 it was announced that Rena Matsui would hold a concurrent position with Nogizaka46 after teams were reorganized and kenkyusei members were promoted to full members. Concurrent member with SKE48 and AKB48 Mina Ōba was fully transferred to SKE48 Team KII and other members from AKB48, NMB48, and HKT48 were permanently transferred or given concurrent positions in SKE48. Former Team K member Miyazawa Sae was transferred from SNH48 and appointed the new leader of Team S.

On March 15, 2015, the members who passed the seventh generation audition were revealed. On June 6, 2015, SKE48 became the first sister group to have more members rank in the annual Single Senbatsu Sousenkyo than AKB48. In 2015, SKE48 released two singles. A third release was published under the label "Love Crescendo" and was promoted as SKE48's first sub project.

On March 11, 2016 2 members of SKE48 members Yuria Kizaki and Kanon Kimoto voiced in the Live action Anime film Shimajiro in Bookland. 

On February 7, 2020, Jurina Matsui announced her graduation from SKE48. In July 2020, Kazuya Ebine, an executive from SKE48's managing company Zest, was arrested for allegedly paying two underage girls to have sex in his car in November 2019.

Members

Team S 
Team S is associated with the color orange, the current leader is Chikako Matsumoto and the vice-leader is Ayuka Kamimura

Team KII 
Team KII is associated with the color red, the current leader is Ayaka Ota and the vice leader is Shiori Aoki.

Team E 
Team E is associated with the color light sea green, the current leader is Akari Suda and Nao Fukushi as the vice-leader.

Kenkyuusei

Captaincy history

Group captaincy

Team captaincy

Team S

Team KII

Team E

Graduated members

Team S

Team KII

Team E

Discography

Studio albums

Stage albums

Singles

See also 
 AKB48
 NMB48
 HKT48
 JKT48
 NGT48
 STU48
 BNK48
 MNL48
 AKB48 Team TP
 AKB48 Team SH
 SGO48
 CGM48
 DEL48

References

External links 

 Official Site 

 
AKB48 Group
Japanese girl groups
Japanese idol groups
Japanese pop music groups
Avex Trax artists
Musical groups from Aichi Prefecture
Musical groups established in 2008
2008 establishments in Japan